Hacılar (also, Gadzhylar) is a village and municipality in the Aghjabadi Rayon of Azerbaijan.  It has a population of 1,240.

References 

Populated places in Aghjabadi District